The Teatro Reinach (also known as the Politeama Reinach) was a theater in Parma, Italy that was designed by architect Pancrazio Soncini. Built in 1871, the venue was host to performance of operas, ballets, plays, and concerts. It was destroyed in 1944 during an air raid in World War II.

References

Opera houses in Italy
Culture in Parma
Theatres in Parma